Themi Antonoglou (born June 2, 2001) is a Canadian soccer player who plays for Toronto FC in Major League Soccer.

Early life
Antonoglou began his youth career with West Toronto SC, where he was scouted by Toronto FC Academy coach Danny Dichio. He debuted for the senior academy team, Toronto FC III in League1 Ontario on September 18, 2018 against Vaughan Azzurri. He is of Greek descent.

Career
While with Toronto FC Academy, he made his debut with Toronto FC II in USL League One in 2019 against the Richmond Kickers. He officially joined Toronto FC II, signing his first professional contract in July 2020. After recording his first professional assist on May 22 against North Texas SC, he scored his first professional goal on May 26 against FC Tucson. On April 15, 2022, he signed a short-term four-day loan with the first team, Toronto FC, ahead of their Major League Soccer match against the Philadelphia Union, but was an unused substitute. He signed additional short-term loans on April 23, April 29, and May 4. and made his first appearance for Toronto FC on April 24, 2022 against New York City FC, in a substitute appearance. He signed a permanent contract with Toronto FC on May 7. He was later loaned back to the second team on May 14. With the second team, he scored a brace in the Conference Finals on October 2, against Columbus Crew, first scoring a free kick in the final seconds of second half injury time to tie the game, and then scored a goal from the midfield line in extra time, although Toronto FC II ultimately was defeated 3-2.

Career statistics

Club

Honours
Toronto FC
Canadian Championship: 2020

References

2001 births
Living people
Canadian soccer players
Canadian people of Greek descent
Association football defenders
Toronto FC players
Toronto FC II players
USL League One players
Soccer players from Toronto
MLS Next Pro players
Major League Soccer players
League1 Ontario players